The National Art School (NAS) is a tertiary level art school, located in , an inner-city suburb of  Sydney, New South Wales, Australia. The school is an independent accredited higher education provider offering specialised study in studio arts practice across various disciplines. 

With its origins in the formation of Sydney Mechanics’ School of Arts in 1843, NAS has been in operation on the historic Darlinghurst Gaol site in East Sydney in various forms since 1922 and was formerly part of East Sydney Technical College, known as East Sydney Tech. Today NAS is a centre for education, research, scholarship and professional practice in the visual arts and related fields.  
  
In 2022 the school marks 100 years occupying the sandstone buildings of the former Darlinghurst Gaol, combining a long artistic tradition with its modern role educating Australia's future contemporary artists.

NAS Tertiary Degree Program
NAS has three full-time visual art degrees: Bachelor of Fine Art (BFA), Master of Fine Art (MFA) and Doctor of Fine Art (DFA). Within the BFA and MFA degrees, students select a major from six artistic disciplines: ceramics, drawing, painting, photomedia, printmaking and sculpture. In addition to learning the skills of their chosen practice, all students also study art history and theory for the duration of their degree.

The degree courses at NAS follow a studio-based teaching model, taught by experienced practicing artists. Each student is allocated their own studio space, and their practical skills are underpinned by core study in drawing for all BFA students. 

Entry to the NAS degree program requires core academic qualifications and the submission of a portfolio of work by the applicant which is reviewed by academic staff. 

Bachelor of Fine Art degree: comprises three inter-related study areas of Studio, Drawing and Art History and Theory. Studio Specialisation is offered in the disciplines of Ceramics, Painting, Photomedia, Printmaking and Sculpture. Drawing and Art History and Theory are core subjects that underpin the studio-based study throughout the course. 

Master of Fine Art degree:  enables graduates to develop the specialised knowledge and skills required for professional practice and further learning, with an advanced and integrated understanding of their chosen discipline and the broader contexts of visual arts practice.

Doctor of Fine Art degree: provides a platform for integrating professional expertise and scholarly enquiry within the visual arts, with graduates acquiring an in-depth understanding of the technical and theoretical skills expected of a professional practitioner in the visual arts.

NAS Alumni and Lecturers
NAS has taught generations of the country's most renowned and accomplished artists, including Margaret Olley, Lyndon Dadswell, Guy Warren, John Olsen, Tim Storrier, Cressida Campbell, Fiona Hall, James Gleeson, Peter Atkins, Lucy Culliton, Karla Dickens, Juz Kitson, Guy Maestri, Mitch Cairns, Joan Ross and Natasha Walsh. (See list below for more alumni.) Many alumni have returned to NAS over the years to teach or talk to students. 

Lecturers at NAS are professional, often award-winning practicing artists across various disciplines. In the 2021 Archibald, Wynne and Sulman Prizes at the Art Gallery of NSW, 31 of the 112 finalists were NAS staff and alumni. Since the Archibald Prize began 100 years ago in 1921, nearly a third of its winners have been NAS alumni or teachers, including multiple winners such as Sir William Dobell and Brett Whiteley.

NAS Short Courses and Schools Programs
In addition to its tertiary degrees, NAS has an extensive program of short courses and workshops taught by experienced artists that run on campus and online throughout the year, catering to students of all ages, backgrounds and levels of experience in the visual arts. 

The school holiday program offers art classes for students from Kindergarten to Year 12, and NAS runs annual outreach education programs such as the Dobell Drawing School for Year 11 students and the Dobell Regional Teachers’ Workshops, funded by the Sir William Dobell Art Foundation.

Cell Block Theatre
The sandstone Cell Block Theatre on the NAS campus was originally D Wing of Darlinghurst Gaol which held some of Sydney's most notorious female criminals including Kate Leigh.

After the closure of the gaol the buildings became derelict until East Sydney Technical Collage moved onsite in 1922. The women's wing was transformed into the Cell Block Theatre, which became a hub of Australia's avant-garde music, theatre and dance scene in the 1960s and 70s, hosting early performances from artists such as John Bell, Yvonne Kenny, Peter Sculthorpe, David Malouf, Jim Sharman and Nick Cave. 

It is now used by the school as an educational space for events including lectures, talks, symposiums and exhibitions, and also as a venue for hire.

Galleries and exhibitions
In addition to its role as an educator, NAS presents a professionally curated annual public exhibition program. Exhibition spaces on campus include the Rayner Hoff Project Space, The Drawing Gallery (opened in 2021) and the two-storey NAS Gallery, which presents up to four major public exhibitions each year as well as the annual NAS Grad Shows featuring the work of graduating students.

NAS's galleries attract more than 30,000 visitors a year, and the critically acclaimed exhibition program promotes and supports Australian contemporary artists alongside other Sydney public art institutions such as the Art Gallery of NSW, the Museum of Contemporary Art and the Museum of Applied Arts and Sciences.

In 2021, NAS presented the Dobell Drawing Prize#22, a long-running biannual prize supported by the Sir William Dobell Art Foundation; Queer Contemporary: Skin Deep, a performance art project and exhibition for the Sydney Gay and Lesbian Mardi Gras; From the Mountain to the Sky: Guy Warren Drawings, celebrating the 100th birthday of NAS alumnus Guy Warren; and John Olsen: Goya's Dog, a major retrospective for NAS alumnus and former teacher John Olsen. 

NAS exhibitions are accompanied by scholarly catalogues and public programs including talks, workshops and symposia to foster the interpretation, understanding and appreciation of art. In 2021 NAS co-presented the Frame of Mind: Mental Health and the Arts public program with Edith Cowan University in Perth, including talks, exhibitions, symposia and a publication.

NAS has been a participating venue for the Biennale of Sydney, the Sydney Festival, the Sydney Gay and Lesbian Mardi Gras, VIVID, Sydney Craft Week, and the annual Sydney Contemporary art fair, exhibiting the work of recent NAS graduates.

Dobell Drawing Prize
In 2019 NAS partnered with the Sir William Dobell Art Foundation to produce the Dobell Drawing Prize #21. The Dobell Prize for Drawing had previously been presented by the Art Gallery of NSW, starting in 1993. The new iteration of the Prize at NAS aims to showcase technical skill, innovation and expanded definitions of drawing, with a major exhibition of finalists open to the public in the NAS Gallery. 

In 2019, the $30,000 acquisitive prize was awarded to Justine Varga, who uses photographic processes as a means of drawing. In 2021, the Dobell Drawing Prize #22 showcased drawings by 64 finalists from around the country, and guest judge artist and NAS alumna Lucy Culliton awarded the prize to Euan Macleod for his pastel on paper work Borderlands – Between NSW and QLD (2020).

A People's Prize was awarded for the first time in 2021 to Joanna Gambotto for her work Hill End Interior 1 (Denningtons Cottage: Kim and Lino's), which pays tribute to the vital role the small NSW town of Hill End has played and continues to play in the Australian visual arts, attracting and inspiring generations of artists.

The Dobell Drawing Prize exhibition is part of the NAS Festival of Drawing, a biennial event organised by the School's National Centre for Drawing which was established in 2020. The festival includes talks, workshops and a research symposium, and with the Dobell Drawing Prize complements the School's rigorous academic drawing program. Drawing is a core component of all studies at NAS and is taught throughout each degree.

National Centre for Drawing
In 2020 NAS launched the National Centre for Drawing, which seeks to promote and nurture practice, research and scholarship in drawing, and in 2021 opened The Drawing Gallery, a new exhibition space on campus dedicated to drawing. The inaugural show in The Drawing Gallery was From the Mountain to the Sky: Guy Warren Drawings, a retrospective of NAS alumnus Guy Warren's drawing practice which opened on his 100th birthday, April 16, 2021.

Governance 
Originally under the management of the NSW Department of Education, in 2009 the School was re-established by the New South Wales Government as a public company limited by guarantee, with two members, the NSW Minister for Arts and the NSW Minister for Education. The Ministers appointed a Board of Directors to oversee governance of the institution.

History
The National Art School is on Gadigal land in Darlinghurst, Sydney, with its inner-city campus on the heritage-listed site of the former Darlinghurst Gaol which dates from 1822.

In 2022 NAS celebrates 100 years teaching art at this location, but the School's history dates back to 1843, when regular art classes were held by John Skinner Prout at the Sydney Mechanics’ School of Arts in Pitt Street, Sydney.

Forty years and several re-organisations later, in 1883 the Technical and Working Men's College became known as the Sydney Technical College, which included the Department of Art. This department was relocated to the former Darlinghurst Gaol in 1922, and was then part of East Sydney Technical College.

The 1920s saw the development of NAS's distinctive studio model of teaching, offering its first five-year Diploma in Art in1926 under Lecturer-in-Charge Samuel Rowe and the English sculptor G Rayner Hoff.

In the 1950s and 1960s, the size and reputation of the Department of Art expanded. Renowned artists such as Colin Lanceley, Ann Thomson, Elisabeth Cummings, Peter Powditch, Ken Unsworth, Martin Sharp, Garry Shead, Janet Mansfield, Tim Storrier and Vivienne Binns graduated from the Diploma Course. At this time, NAS was part of the NSW Government's Department of Technical Education. 

From 1974, NAS went through a long period of upheaval and uncertainty, with a proposal to move the art school out of the Darlinghurst Gaol campus. The decision was fought and protest marches were held but in 1975 the School of Fine Art was transferred to a new institution that would evolve into today's UNSW Art and Design in Paddington, formerly the College of Fine Arts (COFA).

A much-diminished School of Art and Design remained at the Darlinghurst Gaol site as part of the Department of Technical and Further Education (TAFE), offering short certificate courses. Through the efforts of art staff members, and with the support of the newly formed Friends of the National Art School (FoNAS), the visual art program was slowly rebuilt.

In 1996, after much lobbying, NAS gained independence from TAFE. In 1999 it first offered an accredited Bachelor of Fine Art degree, and a Master of Fine Art in 2001.

At this time NAS still sat within the Department of Education and Training (DET), and in 2006 it was under threat of being incorporated into one of NSW's existing universities.

After more lobbying and activity by FoNAS and other NAS supporters, in 2009 the School moved out of DET management and became a fully independent tertiary education provider. Since then NAS has expanded its degrees, short courses and public programs, including offering a Doctor of Fine Art from 2019. 

In 2019, NAS was designated a State Significant Organisation by the NSW State Government (on par with Sydney's Museum of Contemporary Art and Carriageworks), which secured ongoing funding for the School and recognised its important role as a leading tertiary education institution. NAS was also granted a 45-year lease on the former Darlinghurst Gaol site, providing crucial stability for the future.

In 2020 NAS received a significant grant from the NSW State Government for restoration and upgrading of the campus's historic buildings and structures, with the works being undertaken in 2021. The site was also listed on the NSW State Heritage Register in 2021. 

Building began on the original Darlinghurst Gaol in 1822, with convicts hand-carving the sandstone blocks for the surrounding walls which  stood 21 feet (6.5 metres) high when completed in 1824. Built in a distinctive panopticon design, the gaol complex held prisoners from 1841 to 1914 including poet Henry Lawson; newspaper editor JF Archibald; murderer and  artist Henry Louis Bertrand; bushranger Captain Moonlite; Aboriginal outlaw Jimmy Governor; female bushranger Jessie Hickman; Kate Leigh, who became Sydney's famous razor gang madam; and Louisa Collins, the last woman to be hanged in NSW.

In 2022 NAS will mark 100 years since moving into this site, and 200 years since convicts first began building the Darlinghurst Gaol walls in 1822.

Notable alumni

Jean Appleton
Yvonne Audette
Geoffrey Bardon
Tom Bass
Charles Blackman
Vivienne Binns
Cressida Campbell
John Coburn
Kevin Connor
Richard Cornish
Lucy Culliton
Elisabeth Cummings
Geoffrey de Groen
Karla Dickens
Ken Done
Max Dupain
Margaret Fink
Bert Flugelman
Fiona Foley
Merrick Fry
Todd Fuller
James Gleeson
Peter Godwin
Richard Goodwin
Fiona Hall
Norman Hetherington
Frank Hinder
Ian Howard
Robert Klippel
Fred Leist
Keith Looby
Fiona Lowry
Arthur McIntyre
Michael McIntyre
Marie McMahon
Guy Maestri
Reg Mombassa
Arthur Murch
Susan Norrie
Rosaleen Norton
Robert Owen
Margaret Olley
John Olsen
Roslyn Oxley
Mike Parr
Ron Robertson-Swann
Joan Ross
Julie Rrap
Martin Sharp
Garry Shead
Jeffrey Smart
Joshua Smith
Tim Storrier
Thancoupie
Ann Thomson
Dorothy Thornhill
Quinton Tidswell
Barbara Tribe
Tony Tuckson
Craig Waddell
Guy Warren
Brett Whiteley
Wendy Whiteley

NAS Heads and Directors
 Samuel Rowe 1922–1933 
 Rayner Hoff 1934–1937 
 E. C. Walters 1937–1939 
 Frank Medworth 1939–1947 
 Roy Davies 1948–1960 
 Douglas Dundas 1961–1965 
 Harold Abbott 1965–1966 
 Lyndon Dadswell 1966–1967 
 Harold Abbott 1968–1970 
 Peter Laverty 1970–1971 
 John Coburn 1972–1974 
 Tom Thompson 1975–1976 
 Mollie Douglas 1976–1979 
 Don Mitchell 1980–1985 
 Meg Gregory 1985–1990 
 Ted Binder 1990–1996 
 Jeffrey Makin 1997–1998 
 Bernard Ollis 1998–2009 
 Anita Taylor 2009–2013 
 Simon Cooper 2013–2014 (acting) 
 Michael Snelling 2014–2016 
 Michael Lynch 2016–2017(interim) 
 Steven Alderton 2017–present

References

External links
 National Art School (Official website)
 National Art School, Sydney at Google Cultural Institute
 East Sydney Technical College, Sydney Institute of TAFE.
 

 
Darlinghurst, New South Wales